The 1992 North Carolina gubernatorial election was held on  November 3, 1992. Incumbent Governor James G. Martin was unable to run for a third consecutive term due to term limits, and his Lieutenant Governor, Jim Gardner, was chosen to replace him as the Republican nominee. Gardner had also been the nominee in a previous gubernatorial election over twenty years earlier. Former Governor Jim Hunt decided to seek his third term as the Democratic nominee.  The race became one of the nastiest and most talked about races in the country, with Hunt winning a third term easily over Gardner and Libertarian nominee Scott McLaughlin.

Primary election results

General election results

Footnotes

North Carolina
1992
Governor